Clarence is an American animated television series created by Skyler Page for Cartoon Network. Page, a former Cartoon Network storyboard artist for the series Adventure Time and storyboard revisionist for Secret Mountain Fort Awesome, developed the series at Cartoon Network Studios in 2012 as part of their animated short development initiative. The series revolves around a young boy named Clarence, who is optimistic about everything. The network initially commissioned twelve 15-minute episodes, and aired the pilot following the 2014 Hall of Game Awards show on February 17, 2014.

On July 25, 2014, Cartoon Network announced they had ordered 26 more episodes of Clarence, bringing the first season to a total of 51 episodes.

In July 2015, the series was picked up for a second season by Cartoon Network which premiered on January 18, 2016 and ended on February 3, 2017.

The third and final season premiered on February 10, 2017 and ended on June 24, 2018.

During the course of the series, 130 episodes of Clarence  aired over three seasons.

Series overview

Episodes

Pilot (2013)

Season 1 (2014–15)

Season 2 (2016–17)

Season 3 (2017–18)

Shorts

Notes

References

Lists of Cartoon Network television series episodes
 you 
Lists of American children's animated television series episodes
2010s-related lists